Ideaalmaastik is a 1980 Estonian drama film directed by Peeter Simm and based on the story "Kevadkülvi volinik" by Karl Helemäe.

Awards:
 1982: All-Union Film Festival, best director debut: Peeter Simm; best actor: Arvo Kukumägi
 1983: San Remo Film Festival (Italy), 1983, jury special prize to Peeter Simm

Plot

Cast
 Arvo Kukumägi - Deputy Mait Kukemeri
 Tõnu Kark - Chairman Harald Tuvike
 Kalju Komissarov - Secretary of district committee
Priit Adamson - Asser
Reet Paavel - Liina
Aarne Üksküla - Liina's father
Ines Aru - Liina's mother
Paul Poom - Peeter Viksur
Aire Johanson - Peeter Viksur's wife	
Urmas Kibuspuu - Vidrik Kits
Viire Valdma -	Reet Pärn
Helle Kuningas - Asser's aunt 
Roland Selav - Old Kits
Feliks Kark - Bearded man

References

External links
 
 Ideaalmaastik, entry in Estonian Film Database (EFIS)

1980 films
Estonian drama films
Estonian-language films
Films based on works by Estonian writers